Marin Andrei (born 22 October 1940) is a Romanian former footballer. He competed in the men's tournament at the 1964 Summer Olympics.

Career

Club career
Marin Andrei started his senior career playing for Metalul Târgoviște in Divizia B and after two seasons he managed to promote to Divizia A, a competition where he made his debut on 20 August 1961 in a 3–1 victory against UTA Arad. After one Divizia A season with Metalul he went to play together with coach Valentin Stănescu at Rapid București. Andrei was an important player in the first three seasons spent with Giuleștenii as the team managed to be runner-up in all three years, also in the 1964–65 Divizia A season he set a competition record for goalkeepers of 770 minutes without receiving a goal. In the 1966–67 Divizia A season he helped Rapid win the first title in the club's history, playing only three games, as the team's first choice for the goalkeeper position was Rică Răducanu. The next season, Andrei played four games in the league, after which he went to play for one season at Steaua București, where he made eight league appearances, having a hard competition with international goalkeepers Carol Haidu and Vasile Suciu, also managing to win the Cupa României. He went to play for Progresul București in the second league for a half of year, after which he signed with Dinamo București, thus becoming the first player to play for Rapid, Steaua and Dinamo. He won the 1970–71 Divizia A title with Dinamo in which he played four games, as the team's first choice for the goalkeeper position was Mircea Constantinescu, also he made three appearances for the club in the 1971–72 European Cup. Marin Andrei ended his career after playing one season in the second league for Chimia Râmnicu Vâlcea with whom he won the Cupa României.

In 1967, Andrei was contacted by Peruvian champion Club Universitario de Deportes, who wanted a European goalkeeper, but was denied a transfer there because the Romania's communist regime did not allow it.

International career
Marin Andrei played one game for Romania on 23 October 1965 under coach Ilie Oană in a 2–1 loss against Turkey at the 1966 World Cup qualifiers. Andrei also played for Romania's Olympic team in a friendly which ended with a 2–1 victory against Yugoslavia, also playing two games at the 1964 Summer Olympics in Tokyo, appearing in a 1–0 victory against Iran and in a 4–2 victory against Ghana, helping the team finish in the 5th place.

Honours
Metalul Târgoviște
Divizia B: 1960–61
Rapid București
Divizia A: 1966–67
Balkans Cup: 1963–64, 1964–66
Steaua București
Cupa României: 1968–69
Progresul București
Divizia B: 1969–70
Dinamo București
Divizia A: 1970–71
Chimia Râmnicu Vâlcea
Cupa României: 1972–73

Notes

References

External links
 
 

1940 births
Living people
Sportspeople from Târgoviște
Romanian footballers
Romania international footballers
Olympic footballers of Romania
Footballers at the 1964 Summer Olympics
FCM Târgoviște players
FC Rapid București players
FC Progresul București players
FC Steaua București players
FC Dinamo București players
Chimia Râmnicu Vâlcea players
Liga I players
Liga II players
Association football goalkeepers